Anian may refer to:

People
 Anian (Bishop of Bangor), died 1306
 Anian I (Bishop of St Asaph) of the 13th century
 Anian II (Bishop of St Asaph) of the later 13th century

Places
 The Strait of Anián, in the Northwest Passage

See also
 Anianus (disambiguation)
 Einion